Requesens Castle is a historical building in the municipality of Cantallops, Catalonia, Spain.

The edifice is characterized by a triple line of walls, with square and rounded towers, portals and merlons. In the lower court is the chapel, including Romanesque elements from original structures of the area, or of French inspiration.

History
Probably existing since the 9th century, the castle is mentioned for the first time in a document from Ponce I, count of Ampurias in the 11th century.

In the 19th century, the ruined castle was rebuilt in a neo-medieval style. The castle was extensively used after the Spanish Civil War (1936–1939), when some modern constructions were added to the original structure.

External links
Photo gallery 

Houses completed in the 19th century
Requesens
Buildings and structures in the Province of Girona